Ch'utu Urqu (Quechua ch'utu cone, hill, urqu mountain, "cone mountain", also spelled Chuto Orkho) is a mountain in the Andes of Bolivia which reaches a height of approximately . Ch'utu Urqu lies northwest of Iskay Rumi.

References 

Mountains of Potosí Department